A stub is the stock representing the remaining equity in a corporation left over after a major cash or security distribution from a buyout, a spin-out, a demerger or some other form of restructuring removes most of the company's operations from the parent corporation. A stub may retain the name of the original corporation, or in some cases may take another name as part of the restructuring.

References

Corporate finance
Restructuring
Stock market
Equity securities